These are the Oricon number one albums of 1999, per the Oricon Albums Chart.

Chart history

Trivia
Number-one album of 1999: First Love by Hikaru Utada.
Most weeks at number-one: Ayumi Hamasaki with a total of 7 weeks.

See also
1999 in music

1999 record charts
Lists of number-one albums in Japan
1999 in Japanese music